Mayor Young may refer to numerous mayors:

Andrew Young, mayor of Atlanta, Georgia
Bob Young (mayor), mayor of Augusta-Richmond County, Georgia
Coleman Young, mayor of Detroit, Michigan
Harry Young (mayor), council president of San Jose, California
Jack Young (politician), 51st Mayor of Baltimore
James Young (mayor), mayor of Philadelphia, Mississippi
Leigh J. Young, mayor of Ann Arbor, Michigan
Michael Young (mayor), mayor of Victoria, British Columbia

See also
Young (surname)